The soundtrack for the 1968 film Romeo and Juliet was composed and conducted by Nino Rota. It was originally released as a vinyl record, containing nine entries, most notably the song "What Is a Youth", composed by Nino Rota, written by Eugene Walter and performed by Glen Weston. The music score won a Silver Ribbon award of the Italian National Syndicate of Film Journalists in 1968 and was nominated for two other awards (BAFTA Award for Best Film Music in 1968 and Golden Globe Award for Best Original Score in 1969).

The soundtrack is referred to as "Original Soundtrack Recording" on the front cover with further credits to the film itself. Several other editions of the soundtrack feature different covers.

Composition
The original track list includes anthems, song snatches, compositions for the ball and for a strolling trombone player.

The neo-Elizabethan ballad "What Is a Youth" is performed by a troubadour character as part of the diegesis during the Capulets' ball, at which Romeo and Juliet first meet. The original lyrics of "What Is a Youth" are borrowed from songs in other Shakespearean plays, particularly Twelfth Night and The Merchant of Venice. Although Rota's original manuscript is believed to be lost, the love theme is known to have an original published key of G minor. Romeo's theme was described as "a slow-paced minor key idea, first played by a solo English horn with strings". In the scene, where Romeo sees Juliet dancing with her family, the theme is sounded by a solo oboe over a background of tremolo strings.

Reception
In 1968 Billboard described the score as "brilliant and moving". Contemporary feedback was also provided by John Mahoney from The Hollywood Reporter, who described the score as "one of the best and strongest components", noting that "a period ballad with lyric by Eugene Walter, 'What Is a Youth', provides the perfect setting for the meeting of the two lovers at the Capulet party".

Subsequently Professor of English and Shakespearean literature scholar Jill L. Levenson wrote that Rota's score "heightened the sentiment of the lovers' relationship, doing little for their verisimilitude". According to a BBC review, "the suite from Romeo and Juliet is a florid symphony drawing on Rota's classical background for its lush themes – swaggering hunting horn for the amorous swain, mournful lute for the awakening girl".

On the other hand, critic Jack Jorgens dismissed "What Is a Youth" for being "sickly sweet". On Rate Your Music the soundtrack has a score of 3.89 out of 5, based on 55 ratings as of October 2013.

The Love Theme provides the background to the narrative of Our Tune, a long-standing feature on British radio hosted by Simon Bates.

Arrangements
Since 1968 numerous arrangements of "What Is a Youth" have been released, most notably "A Time for Us" and "Ai Giochi Addio", both performed by various artists. The soundtrack's original label Capitol Records subsequently released three other soundtrack albums inspired by the original score. The popularity of the first of them led Capitol Records to release a four-record set of the film's entire vocal and music tracks. On June 25, 2002 the City of Prague Philharmonic Orchestra released their own arrangement of the soundtrack on the Silva America label. Other arrangements were made by André Rieu, Henry Mancini (a top ten hit in 1969), Jet Stream Orchestra, and others. Lana Del Rey's song "Old Money" from her 2014 album Ultraviolence contains samples from "What Is a Youth".

Original track list
Side One
 "Prologue" 2:46	
 "What Is a Youth" 7:24
 "The Balcony Scene" 9:26
Side Two
 "Romeo & Juliet Are Wed" 3:00	
 "The Death Of Mercutio And Tybalt" 3:35	
 "Farewell Love Scene" 4:21	
 "The Likeness Of Death" 2:36	 
 "In Capulet's Tomb" 7:22
 "All Are Punished" 2:07

See also
 "Love Theme from Romeo and Juliet"

References

External links
List of arrangements of "What Is a Youth" from 1968 to 2011
Sheet music for Love Theme from "Romeo And Juliet"

Romance film soundtracks
1968 soundtrack albums
Works based on Romeo and Juliet
Music based on works by William Shakespeare